Thailand competed in the 2008 Asian Beach Games, held in Bali, Indonesia from October 18 to October 26, 2008.

Thailand ranked 2nd in the said competition with 10 gold medals, 17 silver medals and 10 bronze medals.

Medalists

Medal Tally by Sport 

Nations at the 2008 Asian Beach Games
2008
Asian Beach Games